Jibondhuli, also known as The Drummer, is a 2014 Bangladeshi Bengali-language drama film written and directed by Tanvir Mokammel, produced under Kino-Eye Films. The film is based on the Bangladesh Liberation War in 1971, circulating around a lower caste Hindu dhak player. The film was set to be released in December 2013, but eventually premiered in Dhaka on February 14, 2014. Jibondhuli was also premiered at the National Art Gallery of the Shilpakala Academy on October 20, 2017, along with Pich Dhala Path and Monpura.

The film was shot in various locations, including Pubail in Gazipur, and also in Khulna's Chuknagar, where the Chuknagar massacre was depicted.

Plot 
Jibonkrishna Das is a lower caste Hindu drummer who faces humiliation from the upper caste Hindus and the Muslims. When the Pakistan Army captured his village, he attempted to flee to India with his family. On their way though, hundreds of people, including Jibon's family, were killed by the army. Jibon, however, survived and was traumatized by the incident.

Jibon returns to his village, now occupied by the Razakars. He was spared by the commander of the Razakars and later goes to the military base where he was obliged to abandon his dhak and play the western drum for the Pakistan Army. He becomes devastated and even faces discrimination by the army for his religion. Later, the army kidnaps Bengali women and keeps them hostage. The Mukti Bahini fighters arrive and raze the military base. Jibon later abandons the drum and takes his dhak to celebrate the liberation of his village from the razakars.

Cast 
 Shatabdi Wadud as Jibonkrishna Das - A lower caste dhak player who is humiliated by the upper caste Hindus and Muslims.
 Ramendu Majumdar
 Wahida Mollick Jolly
 Chitralekha Guho
 Jyotika Jyoti as Shandharani
 Rafika Eva
 Tabibul Islam Babu
 Pran Roy
 Paresh Acharya
 Uttam Guho
 Mrinal Dutta in the music video 'Ore O Dada, Ami Jabo Sealdah', also sang by Dutta humself.

Music 

The soundtrack album for Jibondhuli was released on July 7, 2013. The album includes two folk songs and four others written by Tanvir Mokammel. The composer of the songs is Syed Shabab Ali Arzoo, who is the film's music director. Rajkumari Dasi Sundori, a survivor of the Chuknagar massacre, unveiled the album cover.

References 

2014 films
Bengali-language Bangladeshi films
Films directed by Tanvir Mokammel
Films based on the Bangladesh Liberation War
Government of Bangladesh grants films